Yule is an ancient Germanic holiday sometimes conflated with Christmas.

Yule may also refer to:


People
 Yule (surname), a surname and list of people with the name
 Yule F. Kilcher (1913–1998), Swiss-born American politician and homesteader

Places
 Yule Peak, Graham Land, Antarctica
 Yule Bay, Victoria Land, Antarctica
 Yule River, Western Australia
 Yule Island, Papua New Guinea

Other uses
 Yule (Middle-earth), a fictional holiday in the works of J. R. R. Tolkien

See also
 
 Jul (disambiguation)